Braulio Alfredo Armoa Mendoza (born 3 November 1978) was a Paraguayan footballer. 

His last club was Chilean side Deportes Puerto Montt.

References
 Profile at BDFA 

1978 births
Living people
Paraguayan footballers
Paraguayan expatriate footballers
People from Encarnación, Paraguay
Club Sportivo San Lorenzo footballers
Sportivo Luqueño players
Club Nacional footballers
Club Tacuary footballers
Club Atlético 3 de Febrero players
Club Deportivo Palestino footballers
Curicó Unido footballers
Puerto Montt footballers
China League One players
Expatriate footballers in Chile
Expatriate footballers in China
Association football defenders